The following is a list of the dragonflies and damselflies found in India.

Aeshnidae

 Aeshna
 Aeshna flavifrons Lichtenstein, 1976
 Aeshna juncea mongolica 
 Aeshna mixta mixta Latreille, 1805
 Aeshna petalura petalura 
 Anaciaeschna
 Anaciaeschna donaldi 
 Anaciaeschna jaspidea (Burmeister, 1839)
 Anaciaeschna kashimirensis 

 Anax
 Anax guttatus (Burmeister, 1839)
 Anax immaculifrons Rambur, 1842
 Anax imperator imperator Leach, 1815
 Anax indicus 
 Anax marginope Baijal et al., 1956
 Anax nigrofasciatus nigrolineatus Fraser, 1935
 Anax parthenope parthenope (Selys, 1839)
 Cephalaeschna
 Cephalaeschna acutifrons 
 Cephalaeschna klapperichi 
 Cephalaeschna masoni 
 Cephalaeschna orbifrons 
 Cephalaeschna viridifrons 
 Gynacantha
 Gynacantha albistyla 
 Gynacantha apicalis 
 Gynacantha arnaudi 
 Gynacantha bainbriggei 
 Gynacantha bayadera Selys,1854
 Gynacantha biharica 
 Gynacantha dravida 
 Gynacantha khasiaca 
 Gynacantha odoneli 
 Gynacantha rammohani 
 Gynacantha rotundata 
 Gynacanthaeschna
 Gynacanthaeschna sikkima 
 Heliaeschna
 Heliaeschna crassa Krüger, 1899
 Heliaeschna uninervulata uninervulata Martin, 1909
 Hemianax
 Hemianax ephippiger (Burmeister, 1839)
 Oligoaeschna
 Oligoaeschna andamani 
 Oligoaeschna khasiana 
 Oligoaeschna martini 
 Periaeschna
 Periaeschna flinti assamensis 
 Periaeschna lebasi 
 Periaeschna magdalena Martin, 1909
 Periaeschna nocturnalis Fraser, 1927
 Periaeschna unifasciata 
 Petaliaeschna
 Petaliaeschna flecheri 
 Planaeschna
 Planaeschna intersedens (Martin, 1909)
 Polycanthagyna
 Polycanthagyna erythromelas (McLachlan, 1896)
 Polycanthagyna ornithocephala (McLachlan, 1896)
 Tetracanthagyna
 Tetracanthagyna waterhousei McLachlan, 1898

Calopterygidae
 Caliphaea
 Caliphaea confusa Hagen in Selys, 1859
 Echo
 Echo margarita margarita 
 Echo margarita tripartita 
 Matrona
 Matrona basilaris nigripectus Selys, 1879
 Neurobasis
 Neurobasis chinensis chinensis (Linnaeus, 1758)
 Vestalis
 Vestalis apicalis apicalis Selys, 1873
 Vestalis apicalis submontana Fraser, 1934
 Vestalis gracilis gracilis (Rambur, 1842)
 Vestalis gracilis montana Fraser, 1934
 Vestalis smaragdina smaragdina Selys, 1879

Chlorocyphidae
 Calocypha
 Calocypha laidlawi 
 Indocypha
 Indocypha vittata (Selys, 1891)
 Libellago
 Libellago lineata andamanensis 
 Libellago lineata blanda 
 Libellago lineata indica 
 Libellago lineata lineata (Burmeister, 1839)

 Rhinocypha

 Rhinocypha bifasciata 
 Rhinocypha biforata abbreviata 
 Rhinocypha biforata biforata Selys, 1859
 Rhinocypha bisignata 
 Rhinocypha cuneata 
 Rhinocypha ignipennis 
 Rhinocypha immaculata 
 Rhinocypha perforata beatifica 
 Rhinocypha perforata limbata Selys, 1879
 Rhinocypha quadrimaculata 
 Rhinocypha spuria 
 Rhinocypha trifasciata 
 Rhinocypha trimaculata 
 Rhinocypha unimaculata 
 Rhinocypha vitrinella

Chlorogomphidae
 Chlorogomphus
 Chlorogomphus atkinsoni (Selys, 1878)
 Chlorogomphus brittoi 
 Chlorogomphus campioni 
 Chlorogomphus fraseri
 Chlorogomphus mortoni
 Chlorogomphus olympicus 
 Chlorogomphus preciosus fernandi 
 Chlorogomphus preciosus preciosus 
 Chlorogomphus schmidti 
 Chlorogomphus selysi 
 Chlorogomphus usudai Ishida, 1996
 Chlorogomphus xanthoptera

Coenagrionidae
 Aciagrion
 Aciagrion approximans 
 Aciagrion azureum 
 Aciagrion hisopa hisopa (Selys, 1876)
 Aciagrion hisopa krishna
 Aciagrion occidentale Laidlaw, 1919
 Aciagrion olympicum 
 Aciagrion pallidum Selys, 1891
 Aciagrion tillyardi Laidlaw, 1919
 Agriocnemis
 Agriocnemis clauseni Fraser, 1922
 Agriocnemis corbeti 
 Agriocnemis dabreui 
 Agriocnemis femina femina (Brauer, 1868)
 Agriocnemis kelarensis 
 Agriocnemis lacteola Selys, 1877
 Agriocnemis pieris 
 Agriocnemis pygmaea (Rambur, 1842)

 Agriocnemis splendidissima 
 Archibasis
 Archibasis oscillans (Selys, 1877)
 Argiocnemis
 Argiocnemis rubescens rubeola Selys 1877
 Cercion
 Cercion calamorum dyeri (Fraser, 1919)
 Cercion malayanum (Selys. 1876)

 Ceriagrion
 Ceriagrion azureum (Selys. 1891)
 Ceriagrion cerinorubellum (Brauer, 1865)

 Ceriagrion coeruleum Laidlaw, 1919
 Ceriagrion coromandelianum (Fabricius, 1798)
 Ceriagrion fallax cerinomelas Lieftinck, 1927
 Ceriagrion fallax pendleburyi Laidlaw, 1931
 Ceriagrion olivaceum Laidlaw, 1914
 Ceriagrion rubiae Laidlaw, 1916
 Coenagrion
 Coenagrion kashmirum 
 Enallagma
 Enallagma cyathigerum cyathigerum (Charpentier, 1840)
 Enallagma immsi 
 Enallagma insula 
 Enallagma parvum Selys, 1876
 Enallagma risi 
 Himalagrion
 Himalagrion exclamatione 
 Himalagrion pithoragarhicum 

 Ischnura
 Ischnura aurora aurora Brauer, 1865
 Ischnura dorothea 
 Ischnura elegans elegans (Vander Linden,1820)
 Ischnura forcipata 
 Ischnura immsi 
 Ischnura inarmata 
 Ischnura patricia 
 Ischnura pumillo 
 Ischnura rubilio 
 Ischnura rufostigma Selys, 1876
 Ischnura senegalensis (Rambur, 1842)
 Mortonagrion
 Mortonagrion aborense (Laidlaw, 1914)
 Mortonagrion varralli 
 Onychargia
 Onychargia atrocyana (Selys, 1865)

 Pseudagrion
 Pseudagrion andamanicum Fraser, 1924
 Pseudagrion australasiae Selys, 1876
 Pseudagrion decorum (Rambur, 1842)
 Pseudagrion hypermelas Selys, 1876
 Pseudagrion indicum Fraser, 1924
 Pseudagrion laidlawi Fraser, 1922
 Pseudagrion malabaricum Fraser, 1924
 Pseudagrion microcephalum (Rambur, 1842)
 Pseudagrion pruinosum pruinosum (Burmeister, 1839)
 Pseudagrion rubriceps rubriceps Selys, 1876
 Pseudagrion spencei Fraser, 1922
 Pyrrhosoma
 Pyrrhosoma nymphula elisabethae 
 Rhodischnura
 Rhodischnura nursei

Cordulegastridae
 Anotogaster
 Anotogaster basalis basalis 
 Anotogaster basalis palampurensis 
 Anotogaster nipalensis 
 Cordulegaster
 Cordulegaster brevistigma brevistigma 
 Cordulegaster brevistigma folia 
 Cordulegaster parvistigma 
 Neallogaster
 Neallogaster annandalei 
 Neallogaster hermionae 
 Neallogaster latifrons 
 Neallogaster ornata 
 Neallogaster schmidti

Corduliidae
 Epophthalmia
 Epophthalmia frontalis binocellata 
 Epophthalmia frontalis frontalis Selys, 1871
 Epophthalmia vittata vittata 
 Epophthalmia vittigera bellicosa Lieftinck, 1948
 Hemicordulia
 Hemicordulia asiatica 
 Idionyx
 Idionyx corona burliyarensis 
 Idionyx corona corona 
 Idionyx galeatus 
 Idionyx imbricatus 
 Idionyx intricatus 
 Idionyx minimus 
 Idionyx nadganiensis 
 Idionyx nilgiriensis 
 Idionyx optatus Selys, 1878
 Idionyx periyashola 
 Idionyx rhinoceroides 
 Idionyx saffronatus 
 Idionyx stevensi 
 Idionyx travancorensis 
 Idiophya
 Idiophya nilgiriensis 
 Macromia
 Macromia annaimalaiensis 
 Macromia bellicosa 
 Macromia cingulata 
 Macromia cupricincta Fraser, 1924
 Macromia ellisoni 
 Macromia flavicincta 
 Macromia flavocolorata 
 Macromia flavovittata 
 Macromia ida 
 Macromia indica 
 Macromia irata 
 Macromia miniata 
 Macromia moorei malayana Laidlaw, 1928
 Macromia moorei moorei 
 Macromia pallida 
 Macromia whitei 
 Macromidia
 Macromidia donaldi 
 Somatochlora
 Somatochlora daviesi Lieftinck, 1977

Diphlebiidae
 Philoganga
 Philoganga montana (Hagen in Selys, 1859)

Epiophlebidae
 Epiophlebia
 Epiophlebia laidlawi Tillyard, 1921

Euphaeidae
 Anisopleura
 Anisopleura comes 
 Anisopleura lestoides 
 Anisopleura lieftincki 
 Anisopleura subplatystyla Fraser, 1927
 Anisopleura vallei 
 Bayadera
 Bayadera hyalina Selys, 1879
 Bayadera indica 
 Bayadera kali 
 Bayadera longicauda 
 Dysphaea
 Dysphaea ethela Fraser, 1924
 Dysphaea gloriosa Fraser, 1938
 Euphaea
 Euphaea cardinalis 
 Euphaea dispar 
 Euphaea fraseri 
 Euphaea masoni Selys, 1879
 Euphaea ochracea brunnea 
 Euphaea ochracea ochracea Selys, 1859
 Schmidtiphaea
 Schmidtiphaea schmidi Asahina, 1978

Gomphidae
 Acrogomphus
 Acrogomphus fraseri 
 Acrogomphus mohani 
 Anisogomphus
 Anisogomphus bivittatus 
 Anisogomphus caudalis 
 Anisogomphus occipitalis 
 Anisogomphus orites 
 Anormogomphus
 Anormogomphus heteropterus 
 Anormogomphus kiritschenkoi 
 Asiagomphus
 Asiagomphus nilgiricus 
 Asiagomphus odoneli 
 Asiagomphus personatus 
 Burmagomphus
 Burmagomphus cauvericus 
 Burmagomphus hasimaricus 
 Burmagomphus laidlawi 
 Burmagomphus pyramidalis pyramidalis 
 Burmagomphus sivalikensis 
 Burmagomphus vermicularis (Martin, 1904)
 Cyclogomphus
 Cyclogomphus heterostylus 
 Cyclogomphus vesiculosus 
 Cyclogomphus wilkinsi 
 Cyclogomphus ypsilon 
 Davidioides
 Davidioides martini 
 Davidius
 Davidius aberrans aberrans
 Davidius aberrans senchalensis 
 Davidius davidii assamensis 
 Davidius delineatus 
 Davidius kumaonensis 
 Davidius malloryi 
 Davidius zallorensis 
 Dubitogomphus
 Dubitogomphus bidentatus 
 Gomphidia
 Gomphidia fletcheri 
 Gomphidia ganeshi 
 Gomphidia kodaguensis 
 Gomphidia platyceps 
 Gomphidia t-nigrum 
 Gomphidia williamsoni 
 Heliogomphus
 Heliogomphus kalarensis 
 Heliogomphus promelas 
 Heliogomphus selysi Fraser, 1925
 Heliogomphus spirillus 
 Ictinogomphus
 Ictinogomphus angulosus 
 Ictinogomphus atrox 
 Ictinogomphus kishori 
 Ictinogomphus pertinax (Selys,1854)
 Ictinogomphus rapax (Rambur, 1842)
 Macrogomphus
 Macrogomphus abnormis 
 Macrogomphus annulatus 
 Macrogomphus montanus 
 Macrogomphus seductus 
 Macrogomphus wynaadicus 
 Megalogomphus
 Megalogomphus bicornutus 
 Megalogomphus flavicolor 
 Megalogomphus hannyngtoni 
 Megalogomphus smithii 
 Megalogomphus superbus 
 Merogomphus
 Merogomphus longistigma longistigma 
 Merogomphus longistigma tamaracherriensis
 Merogomphus martini 
 Microgomphus
 Microgomphus chelifer chelifer 
 Microgomphus souteri 
 Microgomphus torquatus 
 Microgomphus verticalis 
 Nepogomphus
 Nepogomphus modestus 
 Nepogomphus walli (Fraser. 1924)
 Nihonogomphus
 Nihonogomphus indicus 
 Onychogomphus
 Onychogomphus acinaces 
 Onychogomphus biforceps 
 Onychogomphus bistrigatus 
 Onychogomphus cacharicus 
 Onychogomphus dingavani Fraser, 1924
 Onychogomphus duaricus Fraser, 1924
 Onychogomphus grammicus 
 Onychogomphus maculivertex 
 Onychogomphus malabarensis 
 Onychogomphus meghalayanus 
 Onychogomphus nilgiriensis annaimallaicus
 Onychogomphus nilgiriensis nilgiriensis
 Onychogomphus risi 
 Onychogomphus saundersii 
 Onychogomphus schmidti 
 Onychogomphus striatus 
 Onychogomphus thienemanni 
 Ophiogomphus
 Ophiogomphus cerastis 
 Ophiogomphus reductus Calvert, 1898
 Paragomphus
 Paragomphus echinocipitalis 
 Paragomphus lindgreni 
 Paragomphus lineatus 

 Perissogomphus
 Perissogomphus stevensi 
 Phaenandrogomphus
 Phaenandrogomphus aureus 
 Platygomphus
 Platygomphus dolabratus 
 Stylogomphus
 Stylogomphus inglisi Fraser, 1922

Lestidae
 Indolestes
 Indolestes assamicus 
 Indolestes cyaneus 
 Indolestes davenporti 
 Indolestes indicus 
 Indolestes pulcherrimus 
 Indolestes tenuissimus 

 Lestes
 Lestes barbarus (Fabricius, 1798)
 Lestes concinnus Hagen in Selys. 1862
 Lestes dorothea Fraser, 1924
 Lestes elatus 
 Lestes garoensis 
 Lestes malabaricus 
 Lestes nigriceps 
 Lestes nodalis Selys, 1891
 Lestes orientalis 
 Lestes patricia 
 Lestes platystylus Rambur, 1842
 Lestes praemorsus decipiens Kirby, 1893
 Lestes praemorsus praemorsus Hagen in Selys, 1892
 Lestes praemorsus sikkima 
 Lestes thoracicus Laidlaw, 1920
 Lestes umbrinus 
 Lestes viridulus Rambur, 1842
 Orolestes
 Orolestes durga 
 Orolestes motis 
 Orolestes selysi McLachlan, 1895
 Sympecma
 Sympecma annulata annulata 
 Sympecma kashmirensis

Libellulidae
 Acisoma
 Acisoma panorpoides panorpoides Rambur, 1842
 Aethriamanta
 Aethriamanta brevipennis (Rambur, 1842)
 Agrionoptera
 Agrionoptera insignis dorothea 
 Agrionoptera insignis insignis (Rambur, 1842)
 Amphithemis
 Amphithemis curvistyla Selys, 1891
 Amphithemis vacillans 
 Brachydiplax
 Brachydiplax chalybea chalybea Brauer, 1868

 Brachydiplax farinosa Krüger, 1902
 Brachydiplax sobrina (Rambur, 1842)
 Brachythemis
 Brachythemis contaminata (Fabricius,1793)

 Bradinopyga
 Bradinopyga geminata (Rambur, 1842)

 Bradinopyga saintjohanni 
 Camacinia
 Camacinia gigantea (Brauer, 1867)
 Crocothemis
 Crocothemis erythraea erythraea (Brullé, 1832)
 Crocothemis misrai 
 Crocothemis servilia servilia (Drury, 1770)

 Diplacodes
 Diplacodes lefebvrii 
 Diplacodes nebulosa (Fabricius, 1793)
 Diplacodes trivialis (Rambur,1842) 

 Epithemis
 Epithemis mariae 
 Hydrobasileus
 Hydrobasileus croceus (Brauer, 1867)
 Hylaeothemis
 Hylaeothemis fruhstorferi apicalis 
 Hylaeothemis gardeneri 
 Indothemis
 Indothemis carnatica (Fabricius, 1798)

 Indothemis limbata sita 
 Lathrecista
 Lathrecista asiatica asiatica (Fabricius, 1798)
 Libellula
 Libellula quadrimaculata gregorievi
 Lyriothemis
 Lyriothemis acigastra 
 Lyriothemis bivittata 
 Lyriothemis tricolor Ris, 1919
 Macrodiplax
 Macrodiplax cora (Brauer,1867)
 Nannophya
 Nannophya katrainensis Singh, 1955
 Nesoxenia
 Nesoxenia lineata 
 Neurothemis
 Neurothemis fluctuans (Fabricius, 1793)
 Neurothemis fulvia (Drury, 1773)

 Neurothemis intermedia atalanta Ris, 1919
 Neurothemis intermedia degener Selys, 1879
 Neurothemis intermedia intermedia (Rambur, 1842)
 Neurothemis tullia tullia (Drury, 1773)
 
 Onychothemis
 Onychothemis testacea ceylanica 

 Orthetrum
 Orthetrum anceps (Schneider, 1845)
 Orthetrum brunneum brunneum 
 Orthetrum cancellatum cancellatum (Linnaeus, 1758)
 Orthetrum cancellatum kraepelini 
 Orthetrum chandrabali 
 Orthetrum chrysis (Selys, 1891)
 Orthetrum ganeshii 
 Orthetrum garhwalicum 
 Orthetrum glaucum (Brauer, 1865)
 Orthetrum guptai 
 Orthetrum japonicum internum McLachlan, 1894
 Orthetrum luzonicum (Brauer, 1868)

 Orthetrum martensi 
 Orthetrum pruinosum neglectum (Rambur, 1842)
 Orthetrum sabina sabina (Drury, 1770)

 Orthetrum taeniolatum 
 Orthetrum triangulare triangulare (Selys, 1878)
 Palpopleura
 Palpopleura sexmaculata octomaculata
 Palpopleura sexmaculata sexmaculata (Fabricius, 1787)
 Pantala
 Pantala flavescens (Fabricius, 1798)
 Potamarcha
 Potamarcha congener (Rambur, 1842)

 Pseudotramea
 Pseudotramea prateri Fraser, 1920
 Rhodothemis
 Rhodothemis rufa (Rambur, 1842)
 Rhyothemis
 Rhyothemis obsolescens Kirby, 1889
 Rhyothemis plutonia Selys, 1883
 Rhyothemis triangularis Kirby, 1889
 Rhyothemis variegata variegata (Linnaeus, 1763)
 
 Selysiothemis
 Selysiothemis nigra (Van derLinden, 1825)
 Sympetrum
 Sympetrum commixtum (Selys, 1884)
 Sympetrum durum Bartenef, 1916
 Sympetrum fonscolombii (Selys, 1840)
 Sympetrum haematoneura Fraser, 1924
 Sympetrum himalayanum Navas, 1934
 Sympetrum hypomelas (Selys, 1884)
 Sympetrum meridionale (Selys, 1841)
 Sympetrum orientale (Selys, 1883)
 Sympetrum vulgatum flavum (Bartenef, 1915)
 Tetrathemis
 Tetrathemis platyptera Selys, 1878

 Tholymis
 Coral-tailed Cloudwing Tholymis tillarga (Fabricius, 1798)

 Tramea
 Tramea basilaris burmeisteri Kirby,1889
 Tramea eurybia eurybia 
 Tramea limbata similata 
 Tramea stylata 
 Tramea virginia (Rambur, 1842)
 Trithemis
 Trithemis aurora (Burmeister, 1839)

 Trithemis festiva (Rambur, 1842)

 Trithemis kirbyi kirbyi (Selys, 1891)
 Trithemis pallidinervis (Kirby, 1889)

 Urothemis
 Urothemis signata signata (Rambur, 1842)

 Zygonyx
 Zygonyx iris intermedia 
 Zygonyx iris iris 
 Zygonyx iris malabarica 
 Zygonyx iris metallica 
 Zygonyx torrida isis 
 Zyxomma
 Zyxomma petiolatum Rambur, 1842

Megapodagrionidae
 Burmargiolestes
 Burmargiolestes laidlawi

Platycnemididae
 Calicnemia
 Calicnemia carminea carminea 
 Calicnemia carminea pyrrhosoma 
 Calicnemia eximia (Selys, 1863)
 Calicnemia imitans Lieftinck, 1948
 Calicnemia miles (Laidlaw, 1917)
 Calicnemia miniata 
 Calicnemia mortoni 
 Calicnemia mukherjeei 
 Calicnemia pulverulans 
 Coeliccia
 Coeliccia bimaculata Laidlaw, 1914
 Coeliccia didyma didyma (Selys, 1863)
 Coeliccia didyma loringae Laidlaw, 1932
 Coeliccia dorothea Fraser, 1933
 Coeliccia fraseri 
 Coeliccia pracritii 
 Coeliccia renifera 
 Coeliccia rossi 
 Coeliccia sarbottama 
 Coeliccia schmidti 
 Coeliccia svihleri 
 Coeliccia vacca 
 Copera
 Copera ciliata (Selys, 1863)
 Copera marginipes (Rambur, 1842)
 Copera superplatypes 
 Copera vittata assamensis 
 Copera vittata deccanensis 
 Copera vittata serapica 
 Indocnemis
 Indocnemis orang Föster in Laidlaw, 1907
 Platycnemis
 Platycnemis dealbata (Geoffroy in Selys and Hagen, 1850)

Platystictidae
 Drepanosticta
 Drepanosticta annandalei 
 Drepanosticta carmichaeli 
 Drepanosticta polychromatica 
 Platysticta
 Platysticta deccanensis 
 Protosticta
 Protosticta antelopoides 
 Protosticta davenporti 
 Protosticta fraseri 
 Protosticta gravelyi 
 Protosticta hearseyi 
 Protosticta himalaica 
 Protosticta mortoni 
 Protosticta rufostigma 
 Protosticta sanguinostigma

Protoneuridae
 Caconeura
 Caconeura gomphoides 
 Caconeura obscura 
 Caconeura ramburi 
 Caconeura risi 
 Caconeura t-coerulea 
 Disparoneura
 Disparoneura apicalis 
 Disparoneura canningi 
 Disparoneura quadrimaculata 
 Elattoneura
 Elattoneura atkinsoni 
 Elattoneura campioni cacharensis 
 Elattoneura campioni campioni 
 Elattoneura coomansi 
 Elattoneura nigerrima 
 Elattoneura souteri 
 Elattoneura tetrica 
 Esme
 Esme cyaneovittata 
 Esme longistyla 
 Esme mudiensis 
 Melanoneura
 Melanoneura bilineata 
 Phylloneura
 Phylloneura westermanni 
 Prodasineura
 Prodasineura autumnalis (Fraser, 1922)
 Prodasineura odoneli (Fraser, 1924)
 Prodasineura verticalis andamanensis (Fraser, 1924)
 Prodasineura verticalis annandalei (Fraser, 1921)

Synlestidae
 Megalestes
 Megalestes irma 
 Megalestes kurahashii Asahina, 1985
 Megalestes lieftincki 
 Megalestes major 
 Megalestes micans 
 Megalestes raychoudhurii

References 

Subramanian, K.A.; Babu, R. (2017). Checklist of Odonata (Insecta) of India. Version 3.0. zsi.gov.in.
 Prasad, M. & Varshney R.K. (1995). A checklist of the Odonata of India including data on larval studies. Oriental Insects 29: 385-428.
 K.A.Subramanian (2005) Dragonflies and Damselflies of India-A field guide (PDF).

External links 
 https://web.archive.org/web/20091027105941/http://geocities.com/indianodonata/check_list.htm
 https://web.archive.org/web/20070928145929/http://www.asia-dragonfly.net/odonataHelp.php?Level=60&ORR=262144
 http://www.greenexplorer.com/
 DragonflyIndia Yahoo group

India
India
Dragonflies and damselflies